TEENAGER is the second EP by South Korean rock singer, Jung Joon-young, released by CJ E&M on June 26, 2014, as the follow-up to his 1st mini album, which was released in October, 2013.

It contains 6 tracks such as the title track “Teenager.” and other tracks “내가나에게To Me,” “친구Friends,” “이빨Lip Service,” “Hold On,” and “돛단배Sailboat.” All songs in this album were composed and produced by Jung Joon Young himself. He also participated in the design and production of the album's concept, cover picture, and all other minor details regarding the album.

Since Teenager is filled with alternative rock genre which is not a mainstream in Korean music industry, it hasn't been a big hit compare to his 1st mini album which topped on numerous online charts. However it did relatively well on the physical sales; it ranked third on Gaon weekly album chart in its first week of release as well as tenth on the monthly chart in its first month. It has sold over 10,000 copies within its three weeks of release.

As he stated about this album: "I know some aren't into rock, but I'm glad to be doing what I want to do. I know rock is not a popular genre, but it can be, if my music is widely heard." Regardless of the record charts, he is satisfied with his album just like his fans and supporters who really want him to do the music that he wants to do.

Background and release
On June 19, 2014, CJ E&M announced that Jung Joon Young will be releasing his second mini album Teenager on June 26 of the year.

It had already been eight months since the release of his 1st mini album, he finally has returned as a rocker after spending most of the time on TV, appearing in a number of TV reality programs. Though Some fans were even worried that his image would become stuck as a TV figure and not a musician due to his frequent television appearances on entertainment shows rather than musical activities and the delay of his next album, he didn't hasten to release the second album and just focused on making it perfect, as he referred that “It took me about eight months to prepare this album, which I felt was a very short period of time; but since the preparation process was really fun, I did not feel pressured to rush the new release."

While he was preparing for his 2nd mini album, “TEENAGER”, he tried to let his fans participate in making his album 
and share the concept of album. He asked his fans to join in filming his music video as extras and opened up comeback site to share photos of their teenage years on Instagram with the hashtag #IAMATEENAGER for a spot on the site.

Starting on June 19, he unveiled all four teaser images that carry youthful spirit with the mischievous expression and contain special messages for the upcoming album, one a day, to complete a puzzle that consists of four pieces of images at last.

On June 22, Jung Joon Young revealed the track list for “Teenager” through the street mural in Hongdae, a neighborhood known for its lively music and artistic scene.

After dropping of the MV teaser on June 23, he released the MV for his lead single 'Teenager' ahead of the release of his 2nd mini album, on June 25.
The music video represents the concept of the album, ‘a dreaming adult’, properly by portraying Jung Joon-young as an office worker who has the free spirit of a teenager. Unable to withstand the suffocating atmosphere of the office, he escapes to rock out in front of his adoring fans with the song "TEENAGER".

On June 26, 2014, his 2nd mini album, titled “TEENAGER” was released.

Promotion
On June 26, the day of releasing his 2nd mini album “TEENAGER”, a showcase for Jung was held in a unique seminar format on at Seoul's IFC Mall. He was dressed in a suit, just like he would be at a business seminar. He introduced his album and works under the title "Jung Joon Young's Self Presentation". During the showcase, Jung performed three of the album's singles: “Hold On,” “내가 나에게To Me” and the album's lead single “Teenager” with full of burning rock spirit.

Starting from KBS's “Music Bank” on June 27, he has been promoting the title track "TEENAGER", on several music shows such as Mnet's M! Countdown, SBS MTV's The Stage of Big Pleasure, MBC's Music Core and Show! Champion.

He has been meeting his fans through some signing events and especially through more frequent live concerts including “Someday in July”, “Collaboration Concert with Eddie Kim” and “Let’s Rock Festival”.

He has also been performing his album live abroad. After holding his first oversea showcase with 800 fans successfully on July 13, 2014 in Taiwan as well as making a successful American concert debut at K-CON 2014 with charismatic performances on August 10 of that year, he is planning to tour Asia including in major Chinese cities and Japan to promote his album.

Music and lyrics

Music and style
“Teenager” includes a total of six alternative rock songs all composed and produced by Jung Joon Young himself. He got a chance to further develop his musical ability as well as broaden the musical range by creating all tracks in this album. Junggigo and Park Asher have also participated in the album by writing the lyrics to the songs. Pia members Kim Ki Bum and Yang Hye Sung who are Korea's best instrumentalists have also joined Jung Joon Young as the main session band for his album, giving off a strong rock sound.

CJ E&M staff stated: "The second mini album is Jung Joon Young's everything - his past, present, and future. This album is truly by him and made for him. No detail has gone past Jung Joon Young." CJ E&M also revealed that the album is in the alternative rock genre which is Jung Joon Young's favorite since childhood, with the six tracks each showing a different range in the spectrum of the genre. Instead of going with music to satisfy the general public, he explored his music interests through his album. He explained that his 2nd mini album “Teenager” is “more rock” and “less mainstream” compared to his 1st mini album.“This album is harder rock than my first album,” “I really didn’t care much about mass appeal in this album. I think the mass appeal doesn’t really match my musical style. So I enjoyed this album even more and I even liked it better when it was released. Although there would be those people who wouldn’t like some of the tracks, I hope there would be those who would have better thoughts about rock music when they hear my songs,” through the showcase.
	
Every individual single composed by himself is naturally connected and organically united as a cohesive whole with lyrical melodies and sensibility of alternative rock in this album.

Lyrical themes
The concept of Jung Joon Young's new album is "dreaming adult" which seems to be a perfect fit for him. He is storytelling his own story and experiences throughout this album sincerely. He mentioned that “The songs embody the idea of an adult who continues to dream on; as children, we would dream about growing up and what things will be like when we are adults,” “I think even as adults, we have dreams that are always changing so I wanted to express the notion that we are always dreaming children at heart.” during the interview with Koreaherald. In addition, each song brings each unique message like dreams, love, friendship, and loneliness. As an album producer, he made a decision about the concept of the album and chose the songwriters to ask them to write the lyrics that are well suited to the songs.

Singles
내가 나에게(To Me) is an alternative rock song which is added the mood of trendy style of music along with brass instruments, sound effects, and rap. It has the message that It's better to pursue the dream instead of following the money through the lyrics such as “ Why change your own color / why chase your green dollar.” It has attempted rap rock approach with a fast, rhythmic beat and he has used a megaphone to emphasize the chorus line during his live performance on the stages.

The lead single TEENAGER beautifully combines alternative rock music and string arrangements. Conceptually based on the fictional Lost Boys adage of never wanting to grow up, this song is all about trying to recapture one's youth through rock and roll. He stated that he had the most fun with the work evocative of his own teenage years while he was creating this song and he made efforts on completing it perfectly.

이빨(Lip Service) embodies the originality of alternative rock and highlights each musical instrument's color. It expresses the displeasure about flattery and hypocrisy and tells a message that people those who lie finally can get hurt back by their own words.

친구(Friends)is the hardest rock song among six tracks in this album. It is focused on the sounds of musical instruments including electric guitar and especially concentrated on the arrangement and composition to make a clean finish. Lyrically, it describes longing for his friends in other countries far apart from him. It took him only thirty minutes to compose this single after he had met his friends again in the Philippines.

Hold On is characterized by natural sounds of musical instruments. It represents his wish that somebody holds on to him and comforts him when he feels lonely. He confesses that when he is contented and on the spotlight, on the other hand he feels depressed and alone.

돛단배Sailboat is focused on the sound of piano and string arrangement whereas other tracks are concerned with guitar solo. He mentioned that Sailboat is his favorite song among all tracks in this album just like 아는번호(Missed Call) in his 1st Mini Album. So this song delivers quite similar mood like in 아는번호(Missed Call), which is his favorite taste. This song was inspired by the scene of the river during his trip in Paris and it describes the tears as the river that flows continually to the sea for the expression of deep sorrow.

Track listing

Music videos

Charts

Single chart
Teenager

Album chart : TEENAGER

Album Sales

Music Show

Release history

References

2014 EPs
Korean-language EPs
Stone Music Entertainment EPs